Blue Christmas is a 1992 Christmas compilation album with songs sung by American singer and musician Elvis Presley.  Elvis is accompanied by the vocal group the Jordanaires on the recordings from 1957, recorded and initially released on for Elvis’ Christmas Album, and by The Imperials on the recordings from 1971, which were recorded and initially released on Elvis Sings the Wonderful World of Christmas.

Track listing

1976 album

1992 album

References

1992 Christmas albums
Elvis Presley compilation albums
Christmas albums by American artists
1992 compilation albums
Christmas compilation albums
1992 EPs
Elvis Presley EPs
Pop rock Christmas albums
Compilation albums published posthumously